Bistorta tenuicaulis is a species of flowering plant in the family Polygonaceae, native to South Korea and Japan. The species was first described as Polygonum tenuicaule by James Bisset and Spencer Moore in 1878, and transferred to the genus Bistorta by Takenoshin Nakai in 1926.

References

tenuicaulis
Flora of South Korea
Flora of Japan
Plants described in 1878